"Breathe Slow" is a song performed by British singer-songwriter Alesha Dixon. It is the second single from her second studio album, The Alesha Show, released by Asylum Records, a part of Atlantic Records, on 9 February 2009. The song peaked at number three on the UK Singles Chart. The song was nominated at the BRIT Awards 2010 in the Best British single category.

Reception
Popular blog Popjustice made the single their Song of the Day on 30 December 2008, saying "Everyone loves Alesha Dixon. Most people are quite indifferent about purchasing her musical releases. As time goes by we probably have to accept this as fact, but songs like 'Breathe Slow' do offer some hope that she might 'hit the mark' and have a big proper hit one day."

Trash Lounge commented "It's nowhere near the same league as 'The Boy Does Nothing', but 'Breathe Slow' is still a pretty decent offering from its hit-and-miss parent album."

Chart performance
In the United Kingdom, "Breathe Slow" debuted at number 163 on the UK Singles Chart and entered the top 100 the following week at number 92. On 1 February 2009, the song rose into the top 10 at number six, climbed to number five the following week, and peaked at number three after being released physically on 9 February 2009. On the Irish Singles Chart, the single debuted at number 48 and peaked at number 18.

Music video
The video, directed by Max & Dania was shot entirely in black and white, tells the story of Dixon breaking up with her husband, and her trying to regain composure and forget about it. She is seen entering a quiet café, upon leaving she takes off her coat revealing a show-girl outfit and leaves behind her wedding ring, then walks down a busy Las Vegas street. Meanwhile, Dixon is seen dancing alone in studio. The video ends with her entering the stage door of a show with an Elvis impersonator and two other show-girls stood outside. The video, filmed on location in Las Vegas, clashed with the Ricky Hatton vs. Paulie Malignaggi boxing match and caused shooting problems as many British Hatton supporters recognised Dixon, and subsequently crowds gathered in the street. The video has gained over 10 million hits on YouTube.

Track listings
UK CD single
 "Breathe Slow" (Single Version) – 3:40
 "Breathe Slow" (Piano Mix) - 3:41

UK 1-Track Promo [A] (Card sleeve)
 "Breathe Slow" (Piano Mix) - 3:41

UK 1-Track Promo [B] (Blue jewel case)
 "Breathe Slow" (Single Version) – 3:40

UK 4-Track Promo (White jewel case)
 "Breathe Slow" (Single Version) – 3:40
 "Breathe Slow" (Ali Payami Remix) - 6:50
 "Breathe Slow" (Cahill Club Mix) - 6:59
 "Breathe Slow" (Cahill Radio Edit) - 3:33

iTunes EP
 "Breathe Slow" (Piano Mix) - 3:41
 "Breathe Slow" (Cahill Radio Edit) - 3:31
 "Breathe Slow" (Blackout Entertainment Edit) [Featuring Scottie B] - 4:19

Amazon.co.uk / 7Digital EP
 "Breathe Slow" (Single Version) – 3:40
 "Breathe Slow" (Cahill Radio Edit) - 3:33
 "Breathe Slow" (Ali Payami Remix) - 6:50

Charts

Weekly charts

Year-end charts

Sales and certifications

Release history

References

Alesha Dixon songs
2008 songs
2009 singles
Asylum Records singles
Black-and-white music videos
Music videos directed by Max & Dania
Song recordings produced by Soulshock and Karlin
Songs written by Harold Lilly (songwriter)
Songs written by Kenneth Karlin
Songs written by Soulshock